Kasba Peth or Kasba is the oldest residential part, "Peth   " (locality), in Pune, India. It is adjacent to the historic Shaniwar Wada palace-fort. Kasba Peth was the first Peth to be established sometime during the 5th century, and is the oldest area in Pune. It is called the "Heart of Pune City". In the history of Pune, the city was once known as "Kasbe Pune".

Kasba Ganapati is the Gram Devta of Pune. It was built during Shivaji Maharaj's reign. Lal Mahal, the fortified residence of Shivaji Maharaj, was situated in Kasba Peth. Today, its replica can be seen adjacent to Shaniwarwada. Being the oldest part of the City, old residential complexes, "Wada (house)", exist here. Kasba Peth is primarily a residential area. A wide variety of shops surround Kasba Peth (Tambat Ali, Shimpi Ali, Vyavahar Ali, Bhoi Ali, etc.). It is well known for the Kumbhar Wada (area of earthen potmakers) and the Tambat Ali (area of brass/copper utensil manufacturers).

There is a story about the Kasba Ganpati: Some children had brought cows to the area for grazing, and found an idol of Ganapati. Then, they colored this idol and started worshipping it. Shivaji's mother Jijabai also visited the temple often. Hence, Dadoji Konddeo built a pendol in front of the idol; this is where the Kasba Ganpati Temple is located today.

The part of the Peth near the Mutha river is known as Kumbhar Wada (locality of the earthen pot makers). Skilled metal craftsmen (known as Tambat) known for crafting utensils out of brass and copper also reside there.

Lal Mahal and Kasba Ganapati Temple, Twashta Kasar Kalika Devi Temple are some of the places of interest. Budhwar Peth and Shaniwar Peth (in the Southwest), Rasta Peth (in the Southeast), Raviwar Peth (in the South) and Mangalwar Peth (in the East) are the neighbour Peths of Kasba Peth.

References

Peths in Pune